Figure skating competition at the 2015 European Youth Olympic Winter Festival was held in Dornbirn, Austria from January 26 to 28, 2015. Medals were awarded in men's and ladies' singles.

Medal summary

Medalists

Medal table

Results

Men

Ladies

External links
 Short Program Starting Order
 Results at the Skate Austria

European Youth Olympics
Figure skating
2015
2015 European Youth Olympics